Barbie of Swan Lake is a 2003 computer-animated fantasy film co-produced by Mainframe Entertainment and Mattel Entertainment, and distributed by Artisan Home Entertainment. 

Based on the Tchaikovsky ballet Swan Lake, it is the third in the Barbie film series, with Kelly Sheridan providing the voice of Barbie.

Barbie of Swan Lake was released on VHS and DVD on September 30, 2003 by Artisan, later making a television premiere on Nickelodeon on November 16, 2003. and was subsequently released overseas through Entertainment Rights and Universal Pictures Video.

Plot
The story is told by Barbie to her little sister, Kelly, who is feeling uneasy about being at overnight camp for the first time.

Odette is a young woman who lives in a small village with her father and sister, and works in the family bakery. Odette is a talented dancer but is shy and timid about it. Meanwhile, Prince Daniel is informed by his mother that it is time for him to marry and she is hosting a ball for him to choose a wife. The men of the village go after a unicorn named Lila. Lila is followed by a curious Odette into an Enchanted Forest. Lila becomes caught in a bush, so Odette looks for something to free her. She spots a crystal lodged in a rock which she easily removes as the other denizens of the forest watch in astonishment.

The Fairy Queen tells Odette that by freeing the magic crystal, she is destined to defeat the sorcerer Rothbart. Rothbart, her cousin, was angered when she was chosen to become the next ruler of the Forest. Rothbart left and returned years later with his daughter Odile; and has since taken over most of the forest, turning the fairies and elves into animals. Odette, afraid to get involved, declines to help but is confronted by Rothbart, who gives her the same curse as the others, turning her into a swan. The Queen gifts Odette with a tiara embedded with the crystal that protects her from Rothbart's magic. As her powers are too weak, the Queen only partially reverses the spell, allowing Odette to regain human form by night but turn back into a swan by day.

Odette and Lila go meet Erasmus, a troll who takes care of a massive library, in order to find the Book of Forest Lore, which can tell them how to break the spell; however, they are unsuccessful. Daniel, who is out hunting, is lured into the forest by Rothbart, determined to get him to hunt and kill Odette. However, just as he's about to shoot her down, Daniel is captivated by the swan's beauty and decides to let her live. Odette then transforms in front of him and protects him from Rothbart. The two of them spend the night together and fall in love. Daniel invites Odette to the ball the next night.

Erasmus finds the book and reveals that the key to defeating Rothbart is true love. However, if Daniel falls for another girl, the magic crystal will lose its power and Odette will die. Rothbart abducts Erasmus and the book. While Odette rescues Erasmus, Rothbart attends the ball with Odile, magically disguised as Odette. Odette flies to the castle in her swan form to warn Daniel, but is too late; Daniel pledges his love to Odile, causing Odette to collapse.

With the crystal's power gone, Rothbart takes it from Odette. In the Forest, he turns the Fairy Queen into a mouse. Odette wakes up as Daniel arrives to confront Rothbart. Rothbart's spell hits them both, their hands intertwined. At that moment, Rothbart is consumed by the crystal's magic, as Daniel and Odette had tried to protect each other out of true love. Rothbart's evil is undone. Everyone from the village and the Forest celebrate as Odette and Daniel are to be married. Rothbart becomes a cuckoo clock while Odile ends up as a maid in Erasmus's library.

The story of courage gives Kelly new resolve and she promises she will participate in a race the following day.

Cast

Production
The huge success of the first two Barbie videos, Barbie in the Nutcracker and Barbie as Rapunzel, led to Mattel deciding to make a third film. with the movie being announced by Mainframe in September 2002. Barbie of Swan Lake's story is based on the 19th-century German fairy tale "Swan Lake".

As with Barbie's first ballet film Barbie in the Nutcracker, Barbie of Swan Lake was choreographed by the New York City Ballet master-in-chief Peter Martins, and features the movement of New York City Ballet dancers computer animated through motion capture imaging. The dancers were filmed over two days for the ballet sequences with 16 light-emitting cameras that tracked their movements based on reflective squares attached to the dancers' elbows, wrists and legs. The production team at Mainframe Entertainment then superimposed the motion capture data onto computer models of the movie characters, and animated the characters' faces. Motion capture performer Cailin Stadnyk portrayed Barbie's movements, while ballerina Maria Kowroski performed the character's dancing scenes.

New York City Ballet Dancers
Maria Kowroski as Barbie/Odette
Charles Askegard as Ken/Prince Daniel
Ellen Bar as the Fairy Queen
Benjamin Millepied as Ivan the Porcupine
Janie Taylor as Carlita the Skunk
Abi Stafford as the Fox

Music
The film features Tchaikovsky's score from Swan Lake performed by the London Symphony Orchestra, with 15-year-old violinist Nicola Benedetti performing the violin solos. In addition, the film has a theme song that plays over the end credits, "Wings", written by Jason Blume and performed by Leslie Mills.

Release
The film was released on VHS and DVD on September 30, 2003.

The DVD includes the bonus features "The Ballet Dances of Swan Lake", which showcases the film's ballet sequences with accompanying commentary for young viewers, "The Music in You", a 20-minute documentary profiling four girls studying at the Juilliard School of Music, and an interactive game, "Explore the Stars!", challenging children to identify the constellations.

As with the previous two Barbie movies, Entertainment Rights secured global distribution rights to the film outside North America., which remained as such despite the company losing international merchandising rights back to Mattel at the end of the year.

Reception

Critical response
Joseph Szadkowski of The Washington Times praised the film as "beautiful" and "another triumph for Barbie that should inspire youngsters". Rating it two-and-a-half stars out of five, the New Straits Times' R. S. Murthi called it "charming" and wrote, "The CGI work is fluid and the dance choreography by the New York City Ballet [...] is superly translated." Scott Hettrick of the South Florida Sun-Sentinel wrote that the film has "all the elements of a good fairy tale that [are] delightfully translated here visually in this comforting, entertaining and engaging presentation."

Describing the film as "teem[ing] with villainy, magic and fantasy", Nancy Churnin in The Dallas Morning News wrote that Barbie of Swan Lake "exceeds expectations"; she noted its educational value. Reviewing the film for Video Business, Buzz McClain wrote, "Director Hurley overcomes the potential robotic coldness of the digital animation, which at times resembles that of a videogame, by infusing undeniable charm into the story and characters." McClain also noted the cultural value of the film's ballet sequences and classical music, highlighted in the DVD extras.

K. Lee Benson of The Video Librarian recommended Barbie of Swan Lake, calling it a "class act" and a "marked improvement" over the previous two CGI Barbie films. Lynne Heffley of the Los Angeles Times called it a "lavishly detailed computer-animated feature whose creativity and sweet nature nearly mitigates its unavoidable product promotion." Stephanie Prange of Video Store praised the film's animation as "truly beautiful, with bright colours and [a] polished look".

A review in The Daily Telegraph opined that "Transformed into cartoon form, Swan Lake isn't exactly a masterpiece", but recommended the film as a way to introduce children to Tchaikovsky. In a negative review, Robert Gottlieb of The New York Observer opined that Barbie of Swan Lake's "divergences from the ballet are profoundly distorting. Nothing of the troubling heart of Swan Lake remains. Instead, we get a frisky, feminist unicorn and an adorable skunk! To call this Disneyfication is to insult the genius of early Disney and the professionalism of later Disney." Two eight-year-old reviewers for Newsday rated the film 4/5 stars, writing that they enjoyed its "beautiful music and dancing" and  "nice message about believing in yourself."

In a 2021 retrospective review, The Sunday Telegraph called it a "gentle tale" and wrote, "The 2003 animation looks a bit dated now but it can still capture the imagination."

Awards
Video Premiere Award for Best Animated Video Premiere Movie — Nominated (Jesyca C. Durchin and Jennifer Twiner McCarron) 
Golden Satellite Award for Best Youth DVD — Nominated
Video Software Dealers Association Home Entertainment Award for Best Direct-to-Video/Limited Release from an Independent Studio — Won
Video Software Dealers Association Home Entertainment Award for Best Family Title of the Year From an Independent Studio — Won
Video Software Dealers Association Home Entertainment Award for Sellthrough Title of the Year From an Independent Studio — Won

References

External links
 Barbie of Swan Lake Cast and Details 
 Barbie of Swan Lake
 Barbie of Swan Lake (Video 2003) – IMDb
 Barbie of Swan Lake AllRovi 

2003 direct-to-video films
Swan Lake
2003 computer-animated films
2000s English-language films
Films about shapeshifting
Animated films about animals
Films set in the 2000s
Films set in Russia
Swan Lake
Artisan Entertainment films
American direct-to-video films
2000s American animated films
American children's animated fantasy films
Films about witchcraft
Ballet films
Canadian direct-to-video films
Canadian independent films
Canadian animated feature films
Canadian animated fantasy films
Canadian children's fantasy films
2000s children's animated films
2000s children's fantasy films
2003 films
Films directed by Owen Hurley
2000s Canadian films